Strijk is a surname. Notable people with the surname include:

 Andrew Strijk (born 1987), Australian footballer 
 Marjon Strijk, Dutch classical soprano

Dutch-language surnames